Oberon Mall is a shopping mall located in the Indian city of Kochi. The mall was opened formally on 2 March 2009, though it was launched in 2008. The cost of construction of the mall is about 1 billion.

Oberon Mall was developed and promoted by the Oberon Group of Companies, India. The mall is one of the busiest shopping avenues for the city of Kochi.

Wild Fish, a world-class seafood store from Abad Food Services which offers live, fresh and frozen seafood, opened their store in Oberon Mall. A fire broke out at Oberon Mall in May 2017 but no severe damage was reported.

Shopping 
Shops at the mall include Reliance Trends, Reliance SMART, Reliance Footprint, Reliance Digital, Basics, Peter England, Navigator, Scullers, Style Play, Funskool, American Tourister, Twin Birds, Woodlands and Vismay.

Entertainment 
PVR Cinemas is the primary entertainment and family leisure activity offered by the mall.

References

Shopping malls in Kochi
2008 establishments in Kerala
Shopping malls established in 2008